Shaun Donnellan (born 16 October 1996) is an English-born Irish professional footballer who plays as a midfielder for Torquay United.

Personal life
Donnellan was born in Barnet, Greater London, England, and attended St James' Catholic High School in Colindale. He is the son of former Chelsea, Fulham and Republic of Ireland U21 international Leo Donnellan. His uncle, Gary Donnellan, was also a professional footballer for Watford and his younger brother, Leo Jr., played in the National League for Dagenham & Redbridge.

Career
He started his career in the youth team at West Bromwich Albion where he started a two-year scholarship in June 2013. After two seasons playing for the under-21 side he signed his first professional contract in July 2015, signing a one-year deal. In December 2015, he was sent out on loan to National League North side Worcester City on a one-month loan deal. In January 2016, after four appearances and one goal against Corby Town, his loan was extended for a further month. In February 2016, his loan was later extended until the end of the season and Donnellan went on to make a total of sixteen appearances for Worcester, also playing alongside his brother Leo, scoring four goals as the club narrowly avoided relegation.

After his loan return he penned a new one-year contract in July 2016, with the option of a further year in the club's favour. Later in the month he joined EFL League Two side Stevenage on a loan deal until January 2017. At the end of August his loan was cancelled by Stevenage and he return to West Brom having not made a single first team appearance. In January 2017, he was sent out on loan again, joining National League side Dagenham & Redbridge on a three-month loan deal. He was a first team regular for Dagenham as they narrowly missed out on promotion in the play-offs to Forest Green Rovers, making a total of twenty-one appearances.

In June 2017, West Brom chose to take up the option of a further one-year contract extension after the successful loan spell at Dagenham. In August 2017, he was sent on a six-month loan to EFL League One side Walsall after he had impressed in a pre-season friendly against the Saddlers. He made his league debut in a 2–1 win over Oldham Athletic.

After making eleven appearances while on loan at Walsall he returned to his parent club West Brom, Donnellan then joined Yeovil Town on 27 January 2018 on a free transfer, signing an eighteen-month deal. On 8 January 2019, Donnellan left the Glovers after his contract was terminated by mutual consent.

On 31 January 2019, Donnellan signed for National League side Maidstone United.

On 13 July 2019, after impressing manager Alan Dowson in pre-season, Donnellan signed a deal with newly-promoted Woking. He played 32 times in the 2019-20 season, scoring two goals.

On 25 July 2020, Donnellan signed for Maidenhead United. He left the Magpies at the end of the 2021-22 season, after three goals in 43 games.

On 15 July 2022, Donnellan joined Torquay United.

International career
Donnellan is eligible for England and also the Republic of Ireland through his father's family. He received his first call-up for the Republic of Ireland under-19 side in September 2014 for a friendly match against the Netherlands. He replaced Fiacre Kelleher as a second-half substitute in the 1–0 win. A month later he made his second appearance in a 1–0 victory over Sweden. In March 2017 he received his first call-up to the under-21 side for a 2019 UEFA under-21 Championship qualifier against Kosovo, making his debut in a 1–0 victory.

Career statistics

References

External links

1996 births
Living people
Republic of Ireland association footballers
Footballers from the London Borough of Barnet
Republic of Ireland youth international footballers
English people of Irish descent
Association football defenders
West Bromwich Albion F.C. players
Worcester City F.C. players
Stevenage F.C. players
Dagenham & Redbridge F.C. players
Walsall F.C. players
Yeovil Town F.C. players
Maidstone United F.C. players
Woking F.C. players
Maidenhead United F.C. players
Torquay United F.C. players
English Football League players
National League (English football) players
English footballers